Sally Jean Shipard (born 20 October 1987) is a retired Australian international football (soccer) midfielder who played for Canberra United in the Australian W-League from 2009 to 2014 and for Bayer 04 Leverkusen in the German Bundesliga during the 2012 off-season.

Biography
Shipard grew up in Wagga Wagga and played her junior football with Wagga PCYC. Sally, also known as Sal Bones, played from 2009 for the Canberra United in the W-League. In February 2012 she moved to the German Bundesliga, signing for last placed Bayer 04 Leverkusen until the end of the season.

She was a member of the Australian national team competing in the 2007 FIFA Women's World Cup and the 2011 FIFA Women's World Cup. She captained the Australian U-20 national team.

Shipard retired from football in April 2014, due to injuries.

Career statistics

International goals

Honours

Club
Canberra United
 W-League Championship: 2011–12
 W-League Premiership: 2011–12, 2013–14

Country
Australia
 AFC Women's Asian Cup: 2010
 OFC U-20 Women's Championship: 2004

Individual
 Canberra United Player of the Year: 2010–11
 Julie Dolan Medal: 2011–12
 FFA Female Footballer of the Year: 2012

References

External links
Profile at AIS
Weekly blog at Football in the Capital
 

1987 births
Living people
Australian women's soccer players
Australian expatriate sportspeople in Germany
Expatriate women's footballers in Germany
Sportspeople from Wagga Wagga
Bayer 04 Leverkusen (women) players
Canberra United FC players
A-League Women players
Olympic soccer players of Australia
Footballers at the 2004 Summer Olympics
2007 FIFA Women's World Cup players
2011 FIFA Women's World Cup players
Australia women's international soccer players
Women's association football midfielders
People from the Riverina